Xinjiang Television (XJTV) is a local television network station in the Xinjiang Uyghur Autonomous Region, China. It is the major television station in Xinjiang and is located in the capital Ürümqi. It was founded and started to broadcast on October 1, 1970. XJTV currently broadcasts in Mandarin, Uyghur, Kazakh, Kyrgyz and Mongolian languages. In May 2019, Xinjiang Television signed a strategic cooperation and technical assistance agreement with Huawei. So far, it is the only TV channel using the Turkic language based in a communist country.

TV Channel
Xinjiang TV Chinese 新疆卫视(汉语)
Xinjiang TV Uyghur 新疆卫视(维吾尔语)
Xinjiang TV Kazakh 新疆卫视(哈萨克语)
Chinese Variety channel(汉语综艺频道)
Uyghur Variety channel(维吾尔语综艺频道)
Chinese Drama channel(汉语影视频道)
Chinese Economic-life channel(汉语经济生活频道)
Kazakh Variety channel(哈萨克语综艺频道)
Uyghur Economic-life channel(维吾尔语经济生活频道)
Sport Health channel(体育健康频道)
Law Information channel(法制信息频道)
Children channel(少儿频道)
Tianshan Theatre channel(天山剧场频道)
Entertainment Baza channel(娱乐巴扎频道)
Education Online channel(教育在线频道)

References

External links
Official websites:
 Chinese
 Uyghur
 Kazakh

Television networks in China
Mass media in Ürümqi
Television channels and stations established in 1970
1970 establishments in China
Television in minority languages